The Unfish is a 1997 Austrian comedy film directed by Robert Dornhelm. The film was selected as the Austrian entry for the Best Foreign Language Film at the 70th Academy Awards, but was not accepted as a nominee.

Cast
 Maria Schrader as Sophie Moor
 Eva Herzig as Maria Johler
 Andreas Lust as Carl
 Georges Kern as Herr Landauer
 August Schmölzer as Bürgermeister
 Karl Merkatz as Herr Johler
 Bibiane Zeller as Frau Johler
 Rudolf Wessely as Pfarrer

See also
 List of submissions to the 70th Academy Awards for Best Foreign Language Film
 List of Austrian submissions for the Academy Award for Best Foreign Language Film

References

External links
 

1997 films
1997 comedy films
1990s German-language films
Austrian comedy films
Films directed by Robert Dornhelm